Gray's Creek High School is a school in Hope Mills, North Carolina that opened in the fall of 2003. The curriculum of the high school is core academics, supported by a career and technical program that is information technology based.

Notable alumni
 Quanera Hayes  American sprinter specializing in the 400 meters distance, member of USA Olympic team

External links
 School Website

References

Public high schools in North Carolina
Schools in Cumberland County, North Carolina